

References
[Author Unknown] (1899, September 15). "Trust Conference Work". New York Times.

American Bridge Company
American Bridge Company